Cloverleaf High School is a public high school located in Westfield Township, between the villages of Lodi and Westfield Center in Medina County, Ohio, United States.  It is the only high school in the Cloverleaf Local School District.

The school's colors are forest green and white.

Academic achievement 
Cloverleaf has received the highest rating awarded by the Ohio Department of Education of 'Excellent' for three straight years.

Sports 
Cloverleaf is one of the eight schools who compete in the Metro Division of the Portage Trail Conference. They joined the league in 2015.
These sports are offered:
 Football
 Volleyball
 Cross Country
 Boys/Girls soccer
 Boys/Girls golf
 Boys/Girls tennis
 Boys/Girls basketball
 Gymnastics
 Swimming
 Wrestling
 Baseball
 Softball
 Track and Field
 Boys/Girls Bowling Varsity and JV teams 
From 1997 to 2015, Cloverleaf competed as part of the Suburban League. In December 2013, the school announced they would leave the Suburban League and join the Portage Trail Conference for athletics. The school cited declining enrollment as the main reason for the move. The move became official at the beginning the 2015–2016 academic year.

Notable alumni
 Kyle Juszczyk – professional football player in the National Football League (NFL)
Molly Webster – journalist; Senior Correspondent for WNYC's RadioLab; actor (2021 film C'mon C'mon)
Jake Underwood - News Anchor and Reporter; iHeart Media Cleveland, News Radio WTAM 1100
G. Doug Davis - Professor and Author [Troy University]

References

External links

 

High schools in Medina County, Ohio
Public high schools in Ohio